Byng Inlet is a body of water on the eastern shore of Georgian Bay, between Parry Sound and the mouth of the French River. It is a widening of the Magnetawan River, near its mouth. The name of the river "Magnetawan", meaning "long open channel" in the Ojibwe language, refers to this section of the river.

History

Naming of the Inlet
Byng Inlet was named in the honor former British Naval officer John Byng. It was named by Captain Henry Wolsey Bayfield, who charted the Canadian shores of lakes Huron and Superior, formerly involved with Admiral William Fitzwilliam Owen, while surveying the lower Great Lakes Erie and Ontario. For surveying of this region, Bayfield made his headquarters at the Naval Establishment at Penetanguishene in 1819. In 1825, Bayfield returned to England to prepare his charts for the engraver.

Wreck of the Northern Belle
The steamship Northern Belle was suddenly engulfed in a devastating fire in Byng Inlet, on November 10, 1898.  The wreck is a popular site for recreational divers.

See also
 Byng Inlet, Ontario, the village on the south shore
 Britt, Ontario, on the north shore.

References

 

Bays of Ontario
Georgian Bay
Magnetawan River